RC Batyari is a Ukrainian rugby club in Lviv. They are one of the four teams comprising the additional group in the Ukraine Rugby Superliga.

Name
Lviv Batyary - Lviv subculture, which existed from the middle of the 19th century to the middle of the 20th century.

Rugby clubs established in 2009
Ukrainian rugby union teams
Sport in Lviv